Eshaness Lighthouse is situated on the Northmavine peninsula in the north-west of the Shetland Islands, Scotland. It sometimes rendered as Esha Ness Lighthouse.

It was built from concrete because of the unsuitability of local stone.

The light was automated in 1974 and the former lighthouse keepers' accommodation is now holiday accommodation. It is owned by the Shetland Amenity Trust.

See also

 List of lighthouses in Scotland
 List of Northern Lighthouse Board lighthouses

References

Eshaness Northern Lighthouse Board. Retrieved 28 May 2016

External links
 Northern Lighthouse Board 

Lighthouses completed in 1929
Category B listed buildings in Shetland
Category B listed lighthouses
Lighthouses in Shetland
Northmavine